"Maybe It's Time" is a song from the 2018 film A Star Is Born and the soundtrack of the same name, performed by Bradley Cooper. It was written by Jason Isbell and produced by Cooper and Benjamin Rice with additional vocal production by Lady Gaga. The song is a country ballad with lyrics on the theme of salvation and redemption. "Maybe It's Time" has received a positive critical reception and became Cooper's first solo chart entry on the Billboard Hot 100.

Background and writing
After listening to producer Dave Cobb's work, actor Bradley Cooper, who was also directing A Star Is Born, approached him to craft the soundtracks album's sound. Cobb was recording an album in Nashville, Tennessee, with American singer-songwriter and guitarist Jason Isbell, and asked him to write a song for the soundtrack. Isbell asked to see the screenplay and got in touch with Cooper to understand his requirements for the track and to discuss his character Jackson Maine. Cooper wanted a realistic song and urged Isbell to put his own thoughts as a songwriter into the lyrics, resulting in "Maybe It's Time". As he composed the song, Isbell kept in mind the "idea of salvation and redemption throughout the story and the movie, how that's something that comes from within an individual". In an interview with Harper's Bazaar he explained: "That’s what the song deals with more than anything else—whether you reach the point of redemption or not is wholly determined on your own willingness to work. If you’re going to change, it has to come from within."

When Cobb flew to Los Angeles and met Cooper and his co-star Lady Gaga for a writing session, he played "Maybe It's Time". It became Jackson's staple song and set the tone for the rest of the soundtrack. They were impressed. Cooper felt the Americana folk rock blend of the tune fit perfectly with Jackson's character, highlighting his fading career and substance abuse problems.

Recording and composition

Musically, "Maybe It's Time" is a country ballad written by Isbell and produced by Cooper and Benjamin Rice with additional vocal production by Lady Gaga. It is heard several times during the film. Its central lyrics—"Maybe it's time to let the old ways die"—are a metaphor for many of A Star Is Borns central themes, including dealing with and attaining true love and the "double-edged sword of fame". The line is repeated a number of times in the song, accompanied by the line: "It takes a lot to change a man, hell, it takes a lot to try". Reviewing the film for the Vox website, Alissa Wilkinson suggests the song's lyrics signal that the Jackson character, including his music, lifestyle, and what he represents, needs to step aside to "make room for others"—in this case Gaga's character Ally. The song is performed in the key of G major with a moderate tempo of 80 beats per minute in common time. It follows a chord progression of G–C–G–C during the verses and G–Em–D–C–G during the chorus, and the vocals span from B3 to B4.

The Jackson character sings "Maybe It's Time" for the first time in a drag bar after meeting Ally and seeing her performing a cover of "La Vie en rose". Before its production Cooper had reached out to musician Lukas Nelson, with whom he practiced for about a year, learning to play the guitar, and honing his vocal skills. "Bradley's ear is already trained and developed because he sings along to his favorite songs and he knows when it sounds bad," Nelson noted.

Critical reception

Brittany Spanos of Rolling Stone described "Maybe It's Time" as a "sullen triumph of a song" and complimented Cooper's vocal delivery. USA Todays Patrick Ryan wrote that the song is a "wistful" album highlight. Joey Morona of The Plain Dealer also highlighted the track, calling it an authentic country song. According to Wren Graves of Consequence of Sound, "Maybe It's Time" might be the best track on A Star Is Born. The Guardians Ben Beaumont-Thomas also praised the song calling it an "extremely strong" country ballad. Chris DeVille of Stereogum listed it as the best track on the album, calling it a "barebones country song". The Washington Posts Bethonie Butler described the song as vulnerable and swooning, with a Sam Elliott-inspired vocal delivery.

Writing for Thrillist, Esther Zuckerman found the song to be a "soulful ballad". Jeremy Gordon of The Outline felt the track could be a campaign song for a future American presidential candidate who is a younger visionary, noting:

The old ways—hardcore social conservatism, white supremacy, the myth of America as shining city on the hill despite all the people who've been barred from the doors over the last 250 years—need to be forgotten by time. Our future president could try to boil down this idea into an easily reproducible slogan. Or, they could let Jackson Maine's gravelly voice do the talking: "Maybe it's time to let the old ways die."

Gordon ended his article saying that the "catchy track summed up all these sentiments better than any fight song".

Dann Gire of the Daily Arlington Herald found that "Maybe It's Time" portrayed more of a nostalgia for Cooper's character as an artist on the decline, "rather than the optimistic challenge of new talent he undoubtedly was when he first sang it". For Nick Reily from NME, the track was comparable to songs by Kris Kristofferson (who had played the central character in the 1976 film version).

Vulture Natalie Walker ranked it at number 17 in her list of the top songs from A Star Is Born. She "much preferred" the other "hard-edged" songs by Cooper over "Maybe It's Time". Carl Wilson of Slate described Cooper's songs on the soundtrack as "mostly gray zones that one has to sit through, waiting for Gaga to come back", except "Maybe It's Time" which he compared to the work of American singer-songwriter Townes Van Zandt.

Chart performance
Following the soundtrack's release, "Maybe It's Time" debuted at number 93 on the Billboard Hot 100 chart, becoming Cooper's first solo entry and second overall, after lead single, "Shallow" (with Gaga). The song also reached number six on the Digital Songs chart, along with other tracks by Cooper, like "Black Eyes" and "Music to My Eyes". "Maybe It's Time" has sold 116,000 copies in the United States as of March 2019, according to Nielsen SoundScan.

In Canada the track entered the Hot Canadian Digital Songs chart at number 12; it debuted on the Canadian Hot 100 at number 86. In Australia peaked at number 58 on the ARIA Charts, while in New Zealand the track debuted on the country's Hot Singles chart at number 16. Across Europe, "Maybe It's Time" became Cooper's solo entry in Hungary, Scotland and Switzerland, and on the download charts of France and the United Kingdom.

Cover versions
On October 22, 2018, Jason Isbell performed "Maybe It's Time" live at Ryman Auditorium in Nashville, as part of his show's encore. Pearl Jam's Eddie Vedder covered the song live at Tempe, Arizona's Innings Festival in 2019.

Credits and personnel
Credits adapted from the liner notes of A Star Is Born.

Management
 Published by Southeastern Records Publishing (BMI) / Warner-Barham Music LLC (BMI) admin. by Songs of Universal (BMI)
 Recorded at Glastonbury Festival and The Village West (Los Angeles, California)
 Mixed at Electric Lady Studios (New York City)
 Mastered at Sterling Sound Studios (New York City)

Personnel

 Bradley Cooper – primary vocals, producer
 Jason Isbell – songwriter
 Benjamin Rice – producer, recording, mixing
 Lady Gaga – additional vocal producer
 Alex Williams – recording assistant
 John Rooney – mixing assistant
 Randy Merrill – audio mastering
 Lukas Nelson – acoustic guitar
 Jesse Siebenberg – lap steel guitar

Charts

Certifications

References

External links
 

2010s ballads
2018 songs
American country music songs
American folk rock songs
Bradley Cooper songs
Country ballads
Folk ballads
Rock ballads
Song recordings produced by Lady Gaga
Songs written by Jason Isbell
Songs written for films
Song recordings produced by Ben Rice (producer)